Michael Bunker  (born 22 July 1937) was the Dean of Peterborough in the Church of England from 1992 until 2006.

Educated at Acton Technical College and Oak Hill Theological College, he was ordained in 1964.  After curacies at St James’ Church, Alperton and  the Parish Church of St Helen, Merseyside he held two incumbencies in  Muswell Hill (St James then St Matthew) before his elevation to the Deanery.

References

1937 births
Alumni of Oak Hill College
Deans of Peterborough
Living people